Genetic distance is a measure of the genetic divergence between species or between populations within a species, whether the distance measures time from common ancestor or degree of differentiation. Populations with many similar alleles have small genetic distances. This indicates that they are closely related and have a recent common ancestor.

Genetic distance is useful for reconstructing the history of populations, such as the multiple human expansions out of Africa. It is also used for understanding the origin of biodiversity. For example, the genetic distances between different breeds of domesticated animals are often investigated in order to determine which breeds should be protected to maintain genetic diversity.

Biological foundation
In the genome of an organism, each gene is located at a specific place called the locus for that gene. Allelic variations at these loci cause phenotypic variation within species (e.g. hair colour, eye colour). However, most alleles do not have an observable impact on the phenotype. Within a population new alleles generated by mutation either die out or spread throughout the population. When a population is split into different isolated populations (by either geographical or ecological factors), mutations that occur after the split will be present only in the isolated population. Random fluctuation of allele frequencies also produces genetic differentiation between populations. This process is known as genetic drift. By examining the differences between allele frequencies between the populations and computing genetic distance, we can estimate how long ago the two populations were separated.

Measures
Although it is simple to define genetic distance as a measure of genetic divergence, there are several different statistical measures that have been proposed. This has happened because different authors considered different evolutionary models. The most commonly used are Nei's genetic distance, Cavalli-Sforza and Edwards measure, and Reynolds, Weir and Cockerham's genetic distance, listed below.

In all the formulae in this section,  and  represent two different populations for which  loci have been studied. Let  represent the th allele frequency at the th locus.

Nei's standard genetic distance
In 1972, Masatoshi Nei published what came to be known as Nei's standard genetic distance. This distance has the nice property that if the rate of genetic change (amino acid substitution) is constant per year or generation then Nei's standard genetic distance (D) increases in proportion to divergence time. This measure assumes that genetic differences are caused by mutation and genetic drift.

This distance can also be expressed in terms of the arithmetic mean of gene identity. Let  be the probability for the two members of population  having the same allele at a particular locus and  be the corresponding probability in population . In other words,

where  is the total number of loci examined.

Nei's standard distance can then be written as

Cavalli-Sforza chord distance
In 1967 Luigi Luca Cavalli-Sforza and A. W. F. Edwards published this measure. It assumes that genetic differences arise due to genetic drift only. One major advantage of this measure is that the populations are represented in a hypersphere, the scale of which is one unit per gene substitution. The chord distance in the hyperdimensional sphere is given by

Some authors drop the factor  to simplify the formula at the cost of losing the property that the scale is one unit per gene substitution.

Reynolds, Weir, and Cockerham's genetic distance
In 1983, this measure was published by John Reynolds, Bruce Weir and C. Clark Cockerham.
This measure assumes that genetic differentiation occurs only by genetic drift without mutations. It estimates the coancestry coefficient  which provides a measure of the genetic divergence by:

Other measures
Many other measures of genetic distance have been proposed with varying success.

Nei's DA distance 1983
This distance assumes that genetic differences arise due to mutation and genetic drift, but this distance measure is known to give more reliable population trees than other distances particularly for microsatellite DNA data.

Euclidean distance

Goldstein distance 1995

Nei's minimum genetic distance 1973
This measure assumes that genetic differences arise due to mutation and genetic drift.

Roger's distance 1972

Fixation index

A commonly used measure of genetic distance is the fixation index (FST) which varies between 0 and 1. A value of 0 indicates that two populations are genetically identical (minimal or no genetic diversity between the two populations) whereas a value of 1 indicates that two populations are genetically different (maximum genetic diversity between the two populations). No mutation is assumed. Large populations between which there is much migration, for example, tend to be little differentiated whereas small populations between which there is little migration tend to be greatly differentiated. FST is a convenient measure of this differentiation, and as a result FST and related statistics are among the most widely used descriptive statistics in population and evolutionary genetics. But FST is more than a descriptive statistic and measure of genetic differentiation. FST is directly related to the Variance in allele frequency among populations and conversely to the degree of resemblance among individuals within populations. If FST is small, it means that allele frequencies within each population are very similar; if it is large, it means that allele frequencies are very different.

Software
 PHYLIP uses GENDIST
 Nei's standard genetic distance 1972
 Cavalli-Sforza and Edwards 1967
 Reynolds, Weir, and Cockerham's 1983
 TFPGA
 Nei's standard genetic distance (original and unbiased)
 Nei's minimum genetic distance (original and unbiased)
 Wright's (1978) modification of Roger's (1972) distance
 Reynolds, Weir, and Cockerham's 1983
 GDA
 POPGENE
 POPTREE2 Takezaki, Nei, and Tamura (2010, 2014)
 Commonly used genetic distances and gene diversity analysis
 DISPAN
 Nei's standard genetic distance 1972
 Nei's DA distance between populations 1983

See also
 Coefficient of relationship
 Degree of consanguinity
 Human genetic variation
 Phylogenetics
 Allele frequency

References

External links
 The Estimation of Genetic Distance and Population Substructure from Microsatellite allele frequency data., Brent W. Murray (May 1996), McMaster University website on genetic distance
 Computing distance by stepwise genetic distance model, web pages of Bruce Walsh at the Department of Ecology and Evolutionary Biology at the University of Arizona 

Genetics concepts
Phylogenetics